The 1977–78 Montreal Canadiens season was the team's 69th season. The Canadiens won their third straight Stanley Cup, and 21st overall.

Offseason

Regular season

Season standings

Schedule and results

Playoffs

Stanley Cup

Boston Bruins vs. Montreal Canadiens

Montreal wins the series 4–2.

Player statistics

Regular season
Scoring

Goaltending

Playoffs
Scoring

Goaltending

Awards and records
 Prince of Wales Trophy
 Ken Dryden and Michel Larocque, Vezina Trophy
 Bob Gainey, Frank J. Selke Trophy
 Guy Lafleur, Art Ross Trophy
 Guy Lafleur, Hart Memorial Trophy
 Larry Robinson, Conn Smythe Trophy

Transactions

Draft picks

Farm teams

See also
 1977–78 NHL season

References
 Canadiens on Hockey Database
 Canadiens on NHL Reference

Stanley Cup championship seasons
Norris Division champion seasons
Montreal Canadiens seasons
Montreal Canadiens season, 1977–78
Eastern Conference (NHL) championship seasons
Montreal